The SSG 69 (Scharfschützengewehr 69, literally Sharpshooter Rifle 69) is a bolt-action sniper rifle produced by Steyr Mannlicher that serves as the standard sniper rifle for the Austrian Army.

History
Designed as a sniper system to replace the SSG 98k sniper rifle (modified and accurized surplus Karabiner 98k rifles) and adopted in 1969 (hence the designation), it was ahead of its time with the use of synthetics like the stock, trigger guard and magazines and cold hammer-forged barrels for durability. Aside from being the Austrian Army's standard issue sniper rifle, it is also used by several law enforcement organizations. For its era and weight it is extremely accurate and several international competitions have been won using an SSG-69 with accuracy being sub 0.15 mrad (0.5 moa).

In 2015 Steyr ended production of the SSG 69.

Design
The receiver and barrel were designed to provide maximum strength for minimum weight. For this the bolt action uses three pairs of rear-locking lugs (in common with the SMLE), rather than the more common front-locking lugs. This, and the fact that it is only produced in the 'short action' length, limits the chambering to non-magnum calibres. The bolt opening angle of 60 degrees is beneficoal for mounting aiming optics relatively low over the receiver, and the receiver is prepared to accept the bases of SSG (quick detach) optical sight mounts.

The cold hammer forged barrel features a 304.8 mm (1 in 12 inch) twist rate to adequately stabilize the military 7.62×51mm NATO ammunition of the era. This twist rate is slow for optimally stabilizing not at the time available 7.62×51mm NATO sniping rounds loaded with  Hollow Point Boat Tail projectiles.

The fiber glass reinforced ABS polymer stock features removable spacers to adjust the length of pull and an accessory rail on the forearm bottom for mounting a bipod. The choice for a synthetic stock was remarkable, as other sniper rifles at the time were still using wood stocks. The trigger is user adjustable for trigger weight and travel.

The standard polycarbonate resin (branded as Makrolon by Bayer) detachable magazine features a 5-round rotary design that fits flush with the stock, although a 10-round staggered box is available as an accessory. Both are transparent-backed, immediately showing remaining capacity. Even though spool magazines are unusual in military rifles, Steyr-Mannlicher produced Mannlicher–Schönauer rifles with one from early 1900s until 1972.

The Austrian military combined the SSG 69 PI with the Kahles ZF 69 6×42 telescopic sight as an optical sight for their snipers. Later the similar Kahles ZF 84 10×42 telescopic sight was also offered. These optical sights on customer request can feature a Bullet Drop Compensating (BDC) elevation turret tuned for the ballistic trajectory of a particular gun-cartridge combination  with a predefined projectile weight/type, muzzle velocity and air density at ranges. 

Variants 
There were several SSG variants made with differences in barrel diameter and the presence of back up iron sights and cosmetic differences like the stock colour, the only conspicuous anomaly being the SSG-PIV using a 409 mm barrel with a 254 mm (1 in 10 inches) twist designed to handle heavy subsonic ammunition in conjunction with a suppressor.

The SSG action was used in the civilian SSG Match UIT international 300 m target rile – the international shooting union was known as the UIT back then,  today the International Shooting Sport Federation  (ISSF) – that featured a free floating heavy barrel, walnut wood half stock and a Walther target diopter and globe sight line.

Users 

 : Used by the Argentine Army.
 : In use by the Austrian Army and EKO Cobra.
 
 : Limited use in Sino-Vietnamese War.
 
 : Used by the BSF ,ITBP and COBRA(CRPF).
 : Used by the Indonesian Army.
 : Garda Emergency Response Unit
 : Used by YAMAM in 1980s.
 
  : Used by Republic of Korea Marine Corps
 : Marine Corps
 : Used by the Pakistan Army.
 
 
 
 
 
 : In use with BORTAC (United States Border Patrol).

Gallery

See also 
 GOL Sniper Magnum
SSG 82
 Steyr HS .50
 Steyr Scout
 Remington Model 700
 M24 Sniper Weapon System

References

External links 

 Steyr Mannlicher official page
 Steyr SSG 69 manual
 Modern Firearms
 SSG 69 PI at Sniper Central

7.62×51mm NATO rifles
Bolt-action rifles
Police weapons
Sniper rifles of Austria
Rotary magazine firearms